Robert Quincy Lee (January 12, 1869 – April 18, 1930) was a businessman and politician from Texas.  He is most notable for serving as a U.S. representative from Texas's 17th congressional district, an office he held from March 1929 until his death 13 months later.

Biography
Lee was born near Coldwater, Mississippi, and raised in Mississippi and Texas.  He attended the public schools of Mississippi and Fort Worth, Texas and graduated from Fort Worth High School.

In 1891, Lee moved to Caddo, Texas, where he owned a general store and raised cattle.  While living in Caddo, Lee also served as the town's postmaster.  In 1913, he moved to Cisco, Texas, where he operated ranches and farms and was president of the Cisco Banking Company.  In 1919, he was the founder and builder in 1919 of the Cisco & Northeastern Railroad, and he served as its president from 1919 to 1927.  From 1926 to 1927, Lee was He served as president of the West Texas Chamber of Commerce.  He was also active in local government, including service as a member of Cisco's school board.

Congress 
Lee was elected as a Democrat in 1928 to the Seventy-first Congress.  He served from March 4, 1929 until his death.  During his House term, Lee was a member of the Committee on Pensions.

Death
Lee died of a stroke in Washington, D.C. on April 18, 1930 at the age of 61.  He was interred at Oakwood Cemetery in Cisco.

Family
In 1895, Lee's married Ada Magdeline Cook (1875–1902).  After her death, he married Clara Edna (Lee) Lee (1883–1933).

Lee was survived by daughters Julia (1900-1976) (Mrs. Leonard G. Simon) and Ada (1902-1993) (Mrs. Harold M. Oehler), and sons Robert Stein (1898-1971), Edward Arch (1906-1977), and Reginald Quincy (1911-1951).

See also
List of United States Congress members who died in office (1900–49)

References

Sources

Books

External links

1869 births
1930 deaths
Democratic Party members of the United States House of Representatives from Texas
People from Tate County, Mississippi
People from Cisco, Texas